Rose Hill is the name of some places in the U.S. state of Virginia:
Rose Hill, Albemarle County, Virginia
Rose Hill, Fairfax County, Virginia
Rose Hill, Lee County, Virginia
Rose Hill, Rappahannock County, Virginia